Wolfgang Wippermann (29 January 1945 – 3 January 2021) was a German historian. He served as supernumerary professor of modern history at the Friedrich Meinecke Institute of the Free University of Berlin, and also taught at the Berlin University of the Arts and the Fachhochschule Potsdam. Wippermann studied history, German and political science in 
Göttingen and Marburg and received his doctorate from the Free University of Berlin.

As professor at the Friedrich Meinecke Institute, his main research interests were ideologies, especially fascism, antiziganism, communism, and antisemitism. His positions as an historian were controversial: he saw himself as the only historian defending Daniel Goldhagen in the debate surrounding his book Hitler's Willing Executioners.

References 

1945 births
2021 deaths
20th-century German historians
Historians of Nazism
21st-century German historians
Academic staff of the Free University of Berlin
Academic staff of the Berlin University of the Arts
Place of birth missing
Place of death missing
People from Bremerhaven